The genus Elasmus is the only member of the hymenopteran subfamily Elasminae (formerly classified as a separate family, Elasmidae), and contains over 200 species worldwide. They are mostly parasitoids or hyperparasitoids of lepidopteran larvae, though several species are parasitoids of Polistes paper wasp larvae. Some authorities now place Elasmus in the subfamily Eulophinae.

References

Eulophidae
Hymenoptera genera